The Mother Goose Playschool and Gradeschool are of several schools that are part of the Mother Goose Special Schools System in the Philippines.

The main school is in Dagupan. There are also branches in Pasig, Urdaneta, Bayambang, Pangasinan, U.P. Village, Quezon City, Marikina, San Carlos, Pangasinan, and Makati.

Mother Goose Playskool and Gradeschool Dagupan Campus (Main)
The school is in the Tapuac District of Dagupan. The students are from nursery (preschool) to grade 6.

There are two canteens in the school area. The canteen inside the school grounds serves snacks as well as Filipino cuisine such as pancit. The other one, steps outside the school grounds, is preferred by many students because it is larger and it provides an area to eat. In 2007, the school opened a new building, which now houses Intermediate Math, Intermediate Language, Intermediate Reading and Computer classes. Its principal is Julie Palaroan.

Mother Goose Special School System, Inc. Urdaneta City Branch
The school is on Bayaoas Street, Urdaneta City, Pangasinan. The students are from nursery to 4th year high school. There is one canteen within the school area. It was the first open classroom in the city to be fully air-conditioned, except for the high school department. The school has three floors. The first is where the office, preschool department and grades 1–3 are located. The second floor is where students in grades 3–6 are. The second floor also has a computer lab, the TLE Room, toilet room, the library, and the laboratory. The third floor is where the high school students are. The third floor has eight rooms. There is a computer lab, and a TLE room for the high school students.

Regular School Day
Each grade is divided into four classes, two in the morning and two in the afternoon. A class is made of about 10–20 students. The morning classes start at 7:30 and end at 12:30, while the afternoon classes start at 12:30 and end at 5:30.

The primary grades (1–3) and intermediate grades (4–6) have different English, History, Science, and Math teachers. The Christian Living, Physical Education, Computer Lab, Music, and Art teachers are the same. Intermediate grade students study an extra subject called EPP in which students learn how to sew, cook and do projects.

Graduation Day, 2017
This school year, the graduation day was set on March 29, 2017.

Mother Goose Special School System, Inc. San Carlos City Branch
This school is in San Carlos City, Pangasinan. The school consists of a three floor building, a canteen, E.P.P., a basketball court, and a wide area of concrete beside the building where anyone is free to wander by. The high school department, which is in the third floor, has been opened in 2010. Pre-school students were in the first floor, and primary and intermediate students (1-6) on the second. During school events, they build a temporary stage for the first floor, sometimes to the second. Such events are Festival of Words, Christmas Party, Graduation, etc. Sometimes, they hold their events on the second floor, but with no stage; such events were like Parent-Teacher Conference and School Mass. Two computer rooms were built: one in the second and third floor. The library is on the third floor, as well as the Science Lab. High school students were permitted to plant at the rear of the school, where the E.P.P. building stands.

High schools

The school system contains a high school called the Mother Goose Special Science High School, often called "MG". Their high school system has three branches: one in Dagupan (which is their flagship branch), one in San Carlos (which is the newest development of the high school), and one in Urdaneta.

MG High Dagupan Campus (Main)

The Dagupan branch is near its grade school counterpart at the Samson Compound found in Tapuac district. It has one cafeteria, one gym and has other parts which are enjoyed by the students.

The White House of MG is an open, roofed area with ceiling fans, electrical outlets and sometimes has a Wi-Fi.

The branch has two buildings, the Main Building and the Annex Building. The Main Building hosts most of the classes. On the first/ground floor are the cafeteria, the arts room, the Guidance Councilor's office/School's clinic, lockers and two classrooms. A lot of important areas are located on the second floor which include the MG whiteboard, where important announcements and exam schedules are written by the teachers and staff; the Cashier's Office; the Registrar's Office; The Science Laboratory; the Computer Laboratory; one classroom; and the restrooms. The third floor has the Principal's Office, lockers, six classrooms (which have dividers), and a makeshift multipurpose function hall (when the classroom dividers are taken off).

The Annex Building is mostly for the Juniors. It has three floors. It is where the Kitchen, Faculty, Library and Audio-Visual Room is located. This building also has restrooms, three classrooms, an altar and the hallway for the student's lockers, beginning in the schoolyear 2016-2017 and onward, the third floor of the annex building is now used for the Senior High school students and a room reserved for the faculty members.

Girls and boys are usually separated during teaching hours to preserve all Mother Goosians' Christian values, especially chastity. Sex education is forbidden per the Catholic Church's mandatory command, however genital-related topics are discussed during Biology classes which starts on the third year of high school.

In 2009, The Doña Josefa Mendoza Samson Gym was established, covering the school courtyard. It is used to hold contests & competitions of Fests and used for First Friday Mass shootings, originally held at the White House, Brown House, & Gingerbread House. Catholic prayers & coerced singing of the nationalist anthem especially to foreign students is highly promoted and rewarded by the school administration.

There are three sections per year; there are 12 sections overall. 
 I—Dalton, I—Edison, I—Galileo, 
 II—Darwin, II—Linnaeus, II—Mendel, 
 III—Curie, III—Mendeleev, III—Rutherford, 
 IV—Einstein, IV—Newton, and IV—Pascal.

All sections are named after significant scientists derived from their particular field of science studies per year.

Outreach schools
Doña Josefa Mendoza Samson Day Care Center, in Barangay Poblacion Oeste, is dedicated to the late founder's wife. Also in Dagupan.

In 2004, the Mother Goose school in Pasig opened an outreach school in Montalban, Rizal named Mary Queen of Peace Day Care Center. Another followed in 2005, called the "Jaime Cardinal Sin Learning Center" in Sta. Ana, Manila named after Jaime Cardinal Sin.

References

Schools in Dagupan